The 2017–18 FIS Cross-Country World Cup Finals were the 10th edition of the FIS Cross-Country World Cup Finals, an annual cross-country skiing mini-tour event. The three-day event was held in Falun, Sweden. It began on 16 March 2018 and concluded on 18 March 2018. It was the final competition round of the 2017–18 FIS Cross-Country World Cup.

Johannes Høsflot Klæbo of Norway and Hanna Falk of Sweden won the first stage of the mini-tour; a sprint freestyle. Alexander Bolshunov of Russia and Marit Bjørgen of Norway won the two last stages; a mass start classic and a pursuit freestyle. Bolshunov and Bjørgen won the overall standings by defending their leading positions on the third stage.

Overall leadership

The results in the overall standings were calculated by adding each rider's finishing times on each stage. On the sprint stage, the winners were awarded 30 bonus seconds. On the second stage, the three fastest skiers in finish were awarded 15, 10 and 5 bonus seconds, and the ten first skiers to pass the intermediate sprint points were also awarded bonus seconds. No bonus seconds were awarded on the third stage. The skier with the lowest cumulative time was the overall winner of the Cross-Country World Cup Finals.

Overall standings

Stages

Stage 1
16 March 2018
 The skiers qualification times count in the overall standings. Bonus seconds are awarded to the 30 skiers that qualifies for the quarter-finals, distributed as following:
 Final: 30–27–24–23–22–21
 Semi-final: 16–15–14–13–12–11
 Quarter-final: 5–5–5–4–4–4–4–4–3–3–3–3–3–2–2–2–2–2

Stage 2
17 March 2018
Bonus seconds:
 Men: 2 intermediate sprints, bonus seconds to the 10 first skiers (15–12–10–8–6–5–4–3–2–1) past the intermediate points.
 Women: 1 intermediate sprint, bonus seconds to the 10 first skiers (15–12–10–8–6–5–4–3–2–1) past the intermediate point.
 Bonus seconds in finish: 15–10–5 to the 3 first skiers crossing the finish line.

Stage 3
18 March 2018
The race for "Winner of the Day" counts for 2017–18 FIS Cross-Country World Cup points. No bonus seconds are awarded on this stage.

World Cup points distribution
The overall winners were awarded 200 points. The winners of each of the three stages are awarded 50 points. The maximum number of points an athlete can earn is therefore 350 points.

References 

2018
2018 in cross-country skiing
March 2018 sports events in Sweden
Cross-country skiing competitions in Sweden